"Unforgivable" is a song by Dutch disc jockey and record producer Armin van Buuren. It features vocals and lyrics from American singer, songwriter and actress Jaren. The song was released in the Netherlands by Armind on 12 January 2009 as the third single from van Buuren's third studio album Imagine.

Reception 
The webmedia We Rave You considers that the song, 10 years after its release, is an "outstanding production". According to the media, van Buuren is "masterfully combining the melodic elements with the Jaren's spectacular vocal performance in a way which compliments it and allows it to stand out."

Music video 
A music video to accompany the release of "Unforgivable" was first released onto YouTube on 13 January 2009. The music video shows Jaren who plays a deceived woman, driving a car and crying. She reminds her best moments with her husband which she discovered he's unfaithful to her with another woman. At the side of the road, Armin van Buuren hitchhikes. Jaren decides to take him away. Thanks to him she success in forgetting her former husband.

Track listing 
 Netherlands – Armind – digital download 
 "Unforgivable" (extended mix) – 8:13
 "Unforgivable" (First State rough mix) – 8:57
 "Unforgivable" (First State smooth mix) – 9:21
 "Unforgivable" (Stoneface & Terminal dub mix) – 7:24
 "Unforgivable" (Stoneface & Terminal vocal mix) – 9:03

 Netherlands – Armind – 12" 
 "Unforgivable" (First State smooth mix) – 9:21
 "Unforgivable" (Stoneface & Terminal dub mix) – 7:24
 "Unforgivable" (original mix) – 8:13

 Netherlands / United States – Armada digital / Ultra – digital download 
 "Unforgivable" (radio edit) – 3:13
 "Unforgivable" (extended mix) – 8:13
 "Unforgivable" (First State smooth mix) – 9:21
 "Unforgivable" (First State rough mix) – 8:57
 "Unforgivable" (Stoneface & Terminal vocal mix) – 9:03
 "Unforgivable" (Stoneface & Terminal dub mix) – 7:24
 "Unforgivable" (Cerf & Mitiska remix) – 9:30

 Netherlands – Armada – CD single  "Unforgivable" (radio edit) – 3:13
 "Unforgivable" (extended mix) – 8:13
 "Unforgivable" (First State smooth mix) – 9:21
 "Unforgivable" (First State rough mix) – 8:57
 "Unforgivable" (Stoneface & Terminal vocal mix) – 9:03
 "Unforgivable" (Stoneface & Terminal dub mix) – 7:24

 Belgium – Mostiko – CD single "Unforgivable" (radio edit) – 3:13
 "Unforgivable" (First State remix) – 7:02

 Poland – Sony – CD single "Unforgivable" (radio edit) – 3:13
 "Unforgivable" (extended mix) – 8:13

 Poland – Sony – CD single remixes'''
 "Unforgivable" (First State rough mix) – 8:57
 "Unforgivable" (First State smooth mix) – 9:21
 "Unforgivable" (Stoneface & Terminal dub mix) – 7:24
 "Unforgivable" (Stoneface & Terminal vocal mix) – 9:03

Charts

References 

2009 singles
Armin van Buuren songs
2009 songs
Songs written by Armin van Buuren
Armada Music singles
Songs written by Benno de Goeij